Ruby (also known as Geren), is an unincorporated community in Leflore County, Mississippi.

Ruby is located on the Canadian National Railway. A post office operated under the name Geren from 1901 to 1955.

The Railway Express Agency serviced Ruby until 1933.

References

Unincorporated communities in Leflore County, Mississippi
Unincorporated communities in Mississippi